Yank Rachell (born James A. Rachel; March 16, 1903 or 1910 – April 9, 1997) was an American country blues musician who has been called an "elder statesman of the blues". His career as a performer spanned nearly seventy years, from the late 1920s to the 1990s.

Career
Rachell grew up in Brownsville, Tennessee. There is uncertainty over his birth year; although his gravestone shows 1910, researchers Bob Eagle and Eric LeBlanc conclude, on the basis of a 1920 census entry, that he was probably born in 1903.

In 1958, during the American folk music revival, he moved to Indianapolis. He recorded for Delmark Records and Blue Goose Records. He was a capable guitarist and singer but was better known as a master of the blues mandolin. He bought his first mandolin at age eight, in a trade for a pig his family had given him to raise. He often performed with the guitarist and singer Sleepy John Estes.  "She Caught the Katy," which he wrote with Taj Mahal, is considered a blues standard.

He appeared in the 1985 documentary film Louie Bluie (directed by Terry Zwigoff), about the musician Howard Armstrong. Rachell performed with John Sebastian and the J-Band in the film.

By the mid-1990s, Rachell and Henry Townsend were the only blues musicians still active whose careers started in the 1920s. Late in his life Rachell suffered from arthritis, which shortened his playing sessions, but he recorded an album just before his death, Too Hot for the Devil.

Film
Louie Bluie (1985), directed by Terry Zwigoff

See also
List of country blues musicians
List of Piedmont blues musicians

References

External links
Yank Rachell page from Blues World site
Grave marker from Dead Blues Guys site

Illustrated Yank Rachell discography
 Page that talks about details of Yank Rachell's musical practices, such as tuning and picking.

20th-century births
1997 deaths
People from Brownsville, Tennessee
Country blues musicians
American blues singers
American blues guitarists
American male guitarists
Piedmont blues musicians
Delmark Records artists
Jug band musicians
African-American guitarists
American blues mandolinists
20th-century American guitarists
20th-century African-American male singers